Frankfurt Airport station may refer to:

Frankfurt Airport regional station, a train station at Frankfurt Airport for regional trains
Frankfurt Airport long-distance station, a train station at Frankfurt Airport for long-distance trains